James Thomas Harlan (born June 14, 1954) is a former American football offensive tackle in the National Football League for the Washington Redskins.

He played college football at Howard Payne University and was drafted in the sixth round of the 1977 NFL Draft by the San Francisco 49ers.

References

1954 births
Living people
American football offensive tackles
Players of American football from Shreveport, Louisiana
Washington Redskins players